CBHA-FM is a Canadian radio station. It is the CBC Radio One affiliate in Halifax, Nova Scotia, broadcasting at 90.5 MHz. It is the flagship CBC Radio One station for the Maritime provinces. CBHA's studios are located on 7067 Chebucto Road in Halifax, while its transmitter is located on Washmill Lake Drive in Clayton Park.

History
The station was launched in 1944 on 1240 AM with the call sign CBH. Prior to its launch, CBC Radio programming aired on private affiliate CHNS and its shortwave relay CHNX 6.13 MHz (in the 49m band). CBH's initial power was only 100 watts and remained at that level for 18 years. In 1947, the station moved to the CBC Radio Building at 5600 Sackville Street. In 1948, the frequency was changed to 1330, and then to 1340 in 1960. In 1963, the station moved to 860 and boosted its power to 10,000 watts.

However, CBH had to conform its nighttime signal to protect clear-channel sister station CJBC in Toronto, rendering it practically unlistenable at night in some parts of Halifax. To solve this problem, an FM rebroadcaster, CBHA-FM, was established on 90.5 FM in 1977. While it was only intended to be temporary, the CBC was unable to obtain the funding necessary to upgrade CBH's AM signal. On October 1, 1989, the AM station was shut down, and CBHA became the main CBC station in Halifax.

Local programming
The station's local programs are Information Morning and Main Street, hosted by Jeff Douglas, in the afternoon. Additionally, it produces several programs that air across the Maritimes, including the weekday noon-hour regional program Maritime Noon and the regional weekend programs Weekend Mornings, Maritime Magazine, Atlantic Airwaves and Maritime Connection.

Shows are produced at studios in the CBC Radio Building at the intersection of Bell Road, Sackville Street, and South Park Street in Halifax. The station serves the Nova Scotia mainland through a network of rebroadcast transmitters, whose schedule is identical to the signal out of Halifax, with the exception of a regional program weekday afternoons from 3:00 to 4:00. The main transmitter in Halifax, as well as the rebroadcaster in Sheet Harbour, air an additional hour of "Main Street" during this time.

Transmitters

On December 10, 2018, the Canadian Radio-television and Telecommunications Commission (CRTC) approved the CBC's application to operate a new FM transmitter in Digby at 107.1 MHz (channel 296A) with an effective radiated power of 420 watts (non-directional antenna with an effective height of antenna above average terrain of 256.6 metres). The callsign for the new FM transmitter at Digby is CBHA-FM-1 and rebroadcasts the programming of CBHA.

References

External links
CBC Nova Scotia
 

Bha
Bha
Radio stations established in 1944
1944 establishments in Nova Scotia